Mark Ward Tuttle (March 17, 1935 - June 2, 2008) was an American producer and screenwriter. He produced and wrote for television programs including The Beverly Hillbillies, Petticoat Junction, Three's Company (and its spinoff Three's a Crowd), What's Happening Now!!, 227, Life with Lucy and The Facts of Life. Tuttle died in June 2008 at his home in Los Angeles, California, at the age of 73.

References

External links 

Rotten Tomatoes profile

1935 births
2008 deaths
American television writers
American television producers
People from Salt Lake City
American male television writers
20th-century American screenwriters